Miękinia may refer to the following places in Poland:
Miękinia, Lower Silesian Voivodeship (south-west Poland)
Miękinia, Lesser Poland Voivodeship (south Poland)